René Grenier (23 December 1943 – 5 February 2004) was a French racing cyclist. He rode in the 1972 Tour de France.

References

1943 births
2004 deaths
French male cyclists
Place of birth missing